The 2017 Stephen F. Austin football team represented Stephen F. Austin State University in the 2017 NCAA Division I FCS football season. The Lumberjacks were be by fourth-year head coach Clint Conque and played their home games at Homer Bryce Stadium. They played as a member of the Southland Conference. They finished the season 4–7, 4–5 in Southland play to finish in a tie for sixth place.

Schedule

Source:

References

Stephen F. Austin
Stephen F. Austin Lumberjacks football seasons
Stephen F. Austin Lumberjacks football